The 2019 UMass Minutemen football team represented the University of Massachusetts Amherst in the 2019 NCAA Division I FBS football season. They were led by first-year head coach Walt Bell and played their home games at Warren McGuirk Alumni Stadium. This was the fourth year for the Minutemen as an independent; they finished the season at 1–11 and were outscored by their opponents by a combined total of 632 to 237. CBS Sports rated UMass 129th in their ranking of all 130 FBS teams; Akron, the only team that the Minutemen defeated, was ranked last.

Previous season
In Minutemen finished the 2018 season at 4–8. Head coach Mark Whipple resigned at the end of the season. On December 3, 2018, the Minutemen named Florida State offensive coordinator Walt Bell as head coach.

Schedule

Schedule Source:

Game summaries

at Rutgers

Southern Illinois

at Charlotte

Coastal Carolina

Akron

This would be the Minutemen's last win until Week 6 in 2021.

at FIU

at Louisiana Tech

UConn

Liberty

at Army

at Northwestern

BYU

Players drafted into the NFL

References

UMass
UMass Minutemen football seasons
UMass Minutemen football